William Reed (1830–1920) was the author of Phantom of the Poles, published in 1906, in which he proposed his theory that the Earth is in fact hollow, with holes at its poles.

Reed summarizes his theory as follows:

The earth is hollow. The Poles, so long sought, are phantoms. There are openings at the northern and southern extremities. In the interior are vast continents, oceans, mountains and rivers. Vegetable and animal life are evident in this New World, and it is probably peopled by races unknown to dwellers on the Earth's surface.

References

American science writers
Hollow Earth proponents
1830 births
1920 deaths